The Raduša shootout was a shootout between the Macedonian police forces and 4 veterans of the NLA near the village of Raduša close to the Kosovo border, who were smuggling weapons. The Macedonian police recovered a large quantity of weapons and NLA uniforms in their vehicle.

Background

The village of Raduša was a frequent spot for skirmishes and battles during the 2001 insurgency in Macedonia such as the Raduša ambush and Battle of Raduša between the Macedonian security forces and the NLA. The town is located on a road that guards the water supply for the city of Skopje and the Kosovo border. The Kosovo border region is frequently grounds for battles with armed Albanian insurgents and Macedonian security forces such as Operation Mountain Storm three years previously.

Weeks before the Macedonian police forces found several bunkers on the Kosovo border filled with weapons and ammunition including heavy weapons such as machine guns, RPG's, anti-tank mines,  explosives and detonators, one bunker was found in the village of Blace, where Macedonian police were also fired upon by several men. Macedonian media suspected a connection between the bunkers and the armed group but the Macedonian police refused to speculate.

Police action

The shootout occurred at 2AM when members of a Special Police Unit were fired upon by the group after they refused to stop at the request of the police forces. The armed were operating a white van and were members of the NLA during the 2001 insurgency in Macedonia who were smuggling weapons and explosives to Kosovo, three of the men were local Albanians while one was a citizen from Kosovo which the Macedonian police forces claimed was a known criminal who had escaped from prison. The Macedonian security forces found large quantities of weapons and explosives at the sight both old and new models, including TNT explosives, anti-tank mines, mortar rounds, grenades and uniforms and emblems of the NLA and claimed the men were planning to destabilize not just Macedonia but the wider region. Albanian politicians from Macedonia refused to comment on the incident.

See also

 2001 insurgency in Macedonia
 Battle of Raduša
 Raduša ambush
 Operation Mountain Storm
 Blace bunker raid

References

2010 in the Republic of Macedonia